Olleya algicola is a Gram-negative, strictly aerobic, rod-shaped and motile bacterium from the genus of Olleya which has been isolated from the alga Ulva fenestrata from the Pacific.

References

Flavobacteria
Bacteria described in 2017